Progressive Records is an American jazz record company and label owned by the Jazzology group. It produces reissues and compilations of musicians such as Sonny Stitt, Eddie Barefield, George Masso, and Eddie Miller.

History
Progressive Records was founded by Gus Statiras in New York in 1950. When the business declined, Savoy bought and reissued much of the label's catalog, then sold it to Prestige with backing from Bainbridge, a Japanese record company.

Progressive had a revival in the late 1970s when Statiras bought the label back from Fantasy, which by then had absorbed Prestige, which continued into the 1980s. Progressive's second era included recordings by Buddy DeFranco, Scott Hamilton, J. R. Monterose, and Al Haig.

In the 1980s, Progressive was acquired by George Buck and his Jazzology group and is owned by the George H. Buck Jr. Jazz Foundation.

Roster

Catalogue
 PCD-7001 The Horn, Ben Webster
 PCD-7002 Love for Sale, Derek Smith Trio
 PCD-7003 Figure & Spirit, Lee Konitz Quintet
 PCD-7004 Arigato, Hank Jones
 PCD-7009 Complete World Broadcasting Jam Sessions 1944 (contains alternate takes, incomplete Takes, false Starts), Pete Brown & His Orchestra
 PCD-7014 Buddy DeFranco, Buddy DeFranco
 PCD-7015 The Two Progressive Trumpet Spectaculars, Various Artists
 PCD-7016 Let's Fall in Love, Jimmie Maxwell and His Jazz Gentlemen
 PCD-7017 Milt Buckner With Illinois Jacquet, Buddy Tate, Sonny Payne, Joop Scholten, Milt Buckner
 PCD-7018 The Good Life, Danny Moss, Jack Jacobs, The Fourteen Foot Band
 PCD-7019 The Progressive Records All Star Tenor Sax and Trombone Spectaculars, Various Artists
 PCD-7022 Introducing Ben Aronov, Ben Aronov
 PCD-7024 Ornithology, Al Haig
 PCD-7026 The Grand Appearance, Scott Hamilton
 PCD-7028 Buddy Tate-Harry "Sweets" Edison, Buddy Tate, Harry "Sweets" Edison
 PCD-7031 Bird Tracks, Roland Hanna
 PCD-7034 Sonny Stitt Meets Sadik Hakim, Sonny Stitt & Sadik Hakim
 PCD-7035 The Man I Love, The Derek Smith Quartet
 PCD-7036 Hot Knepper and Pepper, Don Friedman
 PCD-7037 Arnett Cobb Is Back, Arnett Cobb
 PCD-7042 Harry (the Hipster) Gibson and His Band, Harry Gibson
 PCD-7043 Invitation, The Don Friedman Trio
 PRO-7047 Richard Carr String Variations, Richard Carr
 PCD-7050 Hal Stein-Warren Fitzgerald Quintet, Hal Stein, Warren Fitzgerald
 PRO-7051 John Donaldson Parousia, John Donaldson
 PCD-7052 Dick Meldonian Quartet, Dick Meldonian
 PCD-7053 The 1943 Trio World Jam Session Recordings, Stuff Smith
 PCD-7054 Funky Butt, Arnett Cobb
 PCD-7055 The Derek Smith Trio Plays Jerome Kern, Derek Smith
 PCD-7059 The Magnificent Tommy Flanagan, Tommy Flanagan
 PCD-7060 Mal 81, Mal Waldron
 PCD-7065 Two-Handed Stride, Judy Carmichael
 PCD-7074 Sammy Price and His Blusicians, Sammy Price
 PCD-7075 Something Wonderful, Ronny White Trio
 PCD-7077 The Exciting Sax of Sammy Rimington, Sammy Rimington
 PCD-7079 Peter Burman Presents Tubby Hayes, Tony Coe
 PCD-7080 Bob Wilber-Dick Wellstood Duet, Bob Wilber, Dick Wellstood
 PCD-7082 How Long Has This Been Going On?, Harry Allen
 PCD-7084 Back to Basics, Milt Hinton Trio
 PCD-7085 Blowing Up a Storm, Jack Millman
 PCD-7086 Cullen Offer, Cullen Offer
 PCD-7088 More Exciting Sax, Sammy Rimington
 PCD-7090 A.K.A The Phantom, Ross Tompkins
 PCD-7091 Feather Merchant, Cullen Offer
 PCD-7092 Bill Charlap/Sean Smith, Bill Charlap, Sean Smith
 PCD-7093 Claude Williams, Claude Williams
 PCD-7094 The Dick Hafer Quartet, The Dick Hafer Quartet
 PCD-7095 On the Edge, The Gene Estes Quartet
 PCD-7096 Silhouettes, Joel Futterman
 PCD-7097 Bob Wilber: A Man and His Music, Bob Wilber
 PCD-7098 Shades of Things to Come, Jack Millman
 PCD-7100 King of Kansas City, Claude Williams
 PCD-7101 The Harry Allen-Keith Ingham Quintet Vol. 1, The Harry Allen-Keith Ingham Quintet
 PCD-7102 The Harry Allen-Keith Ingham Quintet Vol. 2, The Harry Allen-Keith Ingham Quintet
 PCD-7103 Ross Tompkins, Ross Tompkins
 PCD-7104 Cullen Offer, Tenor Saxophone; George Oldziey, Piano; Dan Hall, Bass, Cullen Offer, George Oldziey, Dan Hall
 PCD-7105 Jane Jarvis, Piano Jay Leonhart, Bass, Jane Jarvis, Jay Leonhart
 PCD-7106 A Tribute to Benny Goodman By Ken Peplowski, Shoeless John Jackson Quartet
 PCD-7107 Celebrates the Music of Harold Arlen - Solo Piano, Ross Tompkins
 PCD-7108 Echoes of New Orleans, Al Grey
 PCD-7109 The Brooklyn Four Plus One, The Brooklyn Four Plus One
 PCD-7110 Zoot Sims, Zoot Sims
 PCD-7111 Ronnie Bedford, Ronnie Bedford
 PCD-7112 Vibes a la Red, Red Norvo Combo
 PCD-7113 John's Bunch, John Bunch
 PCD-7114 The Best Thing for You Would Be The Cullen Offer Quartet, Cullen Offer Quartet
 PCD-7116 Mundell Lowe All Stars With Roger Kellaway & Jimmy Rowles, California Guitar
 PCD-7118 Featuring Deane and The Jazz Masters, Deane's Basics
 PCD-7120 Milt Hinton, Milt Hinton
 PCD-7121 The Second Time Around, Red Norvo Combo
 PCD-7122 From the Top, The Condoli Brothers
 PCD-7123 quadrumvirate, Ronnie Bedford & Friends
 PCD-7124 The Three Horns of Herb Steward, Marky's Vibes, Herb Steward
 PCD-7132 Red Norvo in New York, Red Norvo Quintet
 PCD-7134 The John Bunch Quintet, The John Bunch Quintet
 PCD-7135 No Holds Barred, Dave McKenna
 PCD-7136 Ronnie Bedford Quartet, Ronnie Bedford
 PCD-7137 Butch Miles Salutes Chick Webb, Butch Miles
 PCD-7138 November, Jack Reilly Trio
 PCD-7139 Passport to Brooklyn, Passport to Brooklyn
 PCD-7140 George Chisholm's All Stars, George Chisholm
 PCD-7141 Kenny Baker's All Stars/The Dick Morrissey Quartet, Kenny Baker, Dick Morrissey
 PCD-7142 Mary Lou Williams: The Circle Recordings, Mary Lou Williams
 PCD-7144 Peter Comton Big Band/Pat Hawes & His Band, Peter Comton, Pat Hawes
 PCD-7145 Warren Chiasson, Warren Chiasson
 PCD-7146 Quiet Storm in New Orleans, Warren Battiste
 PCD-7147 I'll Play for You, Bill Watrous Quartet and The Bill Watrous Combo in Hollywood
 PCD-7148 High On an Open Mike, Charlie Ventura
 PCD-7149 Constellation, The Struggles All-Stars
 PCD-7150 The George Masso Sextet With Eddie Miller, George Masso
 PCD-7151 The Eddie Barefield Sextet, Eddie Barefield

References

American record labels
Jazz record labels